Classic Endurance Racing (commonly abbreviated as CER) is a sports car racing series founded in 2004 by Patrick Peter's Peter Auto Ltd. It features classic sports cars and its aim is to support the endurance racing revival.

Format
The series consists of events in various European countries. Each race is one hour long.

Previously it was a support event for the Le Mans Series. The 2015 season features six standalone rounds:

 Spa Classic – Circuit de Spa-Francorchamps (Belgium)
 Grand Prix de l'Age d'Or – Dijon-Prenois (France)
 Dix Mille Tours – Circuit Paul Ricard (France)
 Monza Historic – Autodromo Nazionale Monza (Italy)
 Vallelunga Classic – ACI Vallelunga Circuit (Italy)
 Algarve Classic Festival – Autodromo Internacional do Algarve (Portugal)

Regulations
All cars are to be manufactured between the years 1966 and 1979. It consists of four classes, Proto 1 and Proto 2, which consist of Group P and S cars with either +2.0L or -2.0L size engine. There are also two grand tourer classes, GT1 and GT2.

External links

Endurance motor racing
Historic motorsport events